A base hospital is an Australian hospital serving a large rural area, perhaps equivalent to an American District Hospital. It is often supported by smaller hospitals in local communities.

References

Hospitals in Australia
Hospitals
Types of hospitals